Settevoci was an Italian musical variety show broadcast by Rai 1 (at the time called "Programma Nazionale") from 1966 to 1970, hosted by Pippo Baudo and aired on Sunday afternoon. The program was a large success, and contributed to launch the careers of many artists, including Albano Carrisi, Massimo Ranieri, Nicola Di Bari, and Orietta Berti. It also marked the first personal success for the presenter Baudo.

The show consisted of a contest with singers combined in couples, and included a quiz to test their knowledge in the music field. The final results were eventually determined through a clap-o-meter.

References

1960s Italian television series
1970s Italian television series
Italian music television series
RAI original programming
Black-and-white television shows
1966 Italian television series debuts
1970 Italian television series endings